Unriddle and Unriddle 2 (simplified Chinese: 最火搭档) are Singaporean Chinese police crime drama which was telecast on Singapore's free-to-air channel, Mediacorp Channel 8.

Unriddle

Unriddle 2

References

Lists of Singaporean television series episodes
Lists of action television series episodes
Lists of crime television series episodes

zh:最火搭档2#集数列表